John Paul P. Escobal, also known as Pong Escobal (born July 7, 1985 in Davao City) is a Filipino former professional basketball player who last played for the Air21 Express in the Philippine Basketball Association (PBA). He played in San Beda's back-to-back-to-back titles in the NCAA. He was the 11th draft pick of Talk 'N Text Tropang Texters in the 2008 PBA Draft.

References

Living people
San Beda Red Lions basketball players
Filipino men's basketball players
1985 births
Basketball players from Davao City
Point guards
TNT Tropang Giga players
Sta. Lucia Realtors players
Meralco Bolts players
Magnolia Hotshots players
Air21 Express players
TNT Tropang Giga draft picks